The Women's 200 metres T35 event at the 2012 Summer Paralympics took place at the London Olympic Stadium on 31 August. The event consisted of a single race.

Records
Prior to the competition, the existing World and Paralympic records were as follows:

Results

Competed 31 August 2012 at 20:15.

 
Q = qualified by place. q = qualified by time. RR = Regional Record. PB = Personal Best. SB = Seasonal Best.

References

Athletics at the 2012 Summer Paralympics
2012 in women's athletics
Women's sport in London